LibertyBus is a bus operator on the island of Jersey. It is a subsidiary of the Kelsian Group.

History

In February 2012, the HCT Group was awarded a contract by the States of Jersey to operate the island's bus services from January 2013 for seven years with a three-year option taking over from MyBus. The operation was branded LibertyBus after a public vote. LibertyBus also won the Jersey Chartered Institute of Marketing Award, for Best Brand Campaign 2013 for the LibertyBus brand.

In September 2022, the HCT Group sold both LibertyBus and Guernsey's buses.gg operation to the Kelsian Group, following a period of extended financial difficulties for the HCT Group that resulted in the sale of most of its subsidiaries.

AvanchiCard
A smart card payment system named AvanchiCard was introduced in 2013. The name AvanchiCard comes from avanchi, which means advance or move forward in Jèrriais – Jersey’s traditional language. The name was chosen by Jersey’s children and young people through a competition organised with local schools.

LibertyBus have a range of AvanchiCards to suit individual travelling needs: AvanchiCard Concession (senior citizen card), AvanchiCard Visitor (various unlimited single and family passes for visitors to the Island), AvanchiCard Unlimited (Weekly, Monthly & Annual unlimited), AvanchiCard Student and AvanchiCard PAYG (pay-as-you-go).

Fleet
As of October 2022, the LibertyBus fleet consisted of 58 single and double-decker buses.

Prior to their commencement of operations in 2012, LibertyBus took delivery of 33 'Slimline' Optare Solo SRs. In 2013, six Alexander Dennis Enviro400s were also delivered, the first double-decker buses purchased new for the island for many years.

References

External links

Company website
School bus information

Kelsian Group
Public transport in Jersey